Domenico Ghislandi ( 1620–1717) was an Italian painter, mainly active in Bergamo as a quadratura painter during the Baroque period.

He was born circa 1620 in Bergamo.  He is perhaps better known due to his son Vittore Ghislandi, called Fra Galgario, was born in 1655 in Bergamo. Domenico painted decorations for the Palazzo Pelliccioli del Portone in Alzano Lombardo. He painted some of the quadrature (1645) in the Sala rossa of Palazzo Terzi that has figures later painted by Cristoforo Storer.

References

External links

1620 births
1717 deaths
17th-century Italian painters
Italian male painters
18th-century Italian painters
Painters from Bergamo
Italian Baroque painters
Quadratura painters
18th-century Italian male artists